Stew Peters (born April 1, 1980) is an American far-right online personality and bounty hunter. He is known for promoting COVID-19 misinformation and conspiracy theories.

His online show is titled the Stew Peters Show, and airs on weekdays. His show routinely features conspiracy theories about governmental organizations, such as the CDC. His guests have included established proponents of conspiracy theories such as Paul Gosar, Mark Meadows, and L. Lin Wood.

Early life and education 
Peters grew up in Minnesota. Initially, Peters thought he would become a police officer or an entertainer during high school. However, he lacked the required skills in either profession. Peters took classes towards a law enforcement degree.

Career

Early career 
After high school, Peters moved from Minnesota to Los Angeles, Florida and New York while pursuing a career as a rapper named Fokiss. As a rapper, he performed at several night clubs and bars around Minneapolis and Duluth including 7th St. Entry at the landmark 1st Avenue. He briefly interned at 101.3 KDWB-FM in 1998.

In 2000, he auditioned for a film directed by Tyrel Ventura, the son of then-Minnesota governor Jesse Ventura. After obtaining a lead role in the film, Peters lied to Ventura that his brother was a teen heartthrob who starred in a popular 1990s sitcom. Tyrel invited Peters to stay at the governor's residence in St. Paul during filming. Peters went home to Apple Valley, a suburb 16 miles away, and later moved into the residence's guest room of the residence for several weeks, until he was evicted by the state troopers providing security for the governor.

After his incident in Minnesota, Peters, using the nom 'de aire FOKISS, moved to Tampa, Florida when, in 2002, he became an intern for former iHeartRadio night host Jason Jones, also known as "Big Mama" who had been a popular local radio personality in the late 90's and early 2000's. "Fokiss" was then known as an aspiring gangster rapper whom had not had much success landing a recording contract with any recording labels. For reasons still unclear, his relationship as an intern with "Big Mama" soured and he exited the radio station, WFLZ-FM, at an undisclosed time for still undisclosed reasons. It's believed his radio broadcast career came to an end at that point, at least, regarding broadcast music and streaming radio.

Bounty hunting 
Peters was a bounty hunter before producing internet content. He started moonlighting as a bounty hunter after he met someone in the business.

Peters heads a bounty hunting agency named Twin Cities Apprehension Team (T.C.A.T). The agency works primarily in the Twin Cities but has tracked fugitives across state lines. T.C.A.T. has apprehended fugitives wanted for DWI, drug possession/dealing, domestic abuse and child sex trafficking.

In 2015, Minnesota Law was changed to limit what bounty hunters can wear and drive. This was at a time when Peters was constantly being mistaken for government law enforcement.

On May 30, 2017, Peters' agency, Twin Cities Apprehension Team (T.C.A.T.) was involved in a fatal shootout. The shooting left two agents and the fugitive dead. T.C.A.T. had tracked Ramon Hutchinson from Hennepin County, Minnesota to Greenville, Texas. Hutchinson was wanted after missing a court date for driving under the influence (DUI) arrest, assaulting a police officer, and cocaine possession. In Greenville, T.C.A.T. used a tracking device on Hutchinson's girlfriend's car to find him at a car dealership during a trade in. Cell phone video shows two T.C.A.T. agents, Gabriel Bernal and Fidel Garcia Jr, approaching Hutchinson. When the two agents told Hutchinson the charges against him, Hutchinson pulled out a gun and opened fire. When it was all over, all three men were dead. When asked about the shootout, Peters said: "It's just a horrible loss. Fidel was just a great friend".

Online personality 
Peters launched The Stew Peters Show as a podcast in 2020, commenting on criminality and related topics, also giving air time to figures of the American far-right and the anti-vaccination movement (such as Del Bigtree).

In 2021, he, along with L. Lin Wood, became involved in a feud with Michael Flynn and Marjorie Taylor Greene regarding Flynn's endorsement of Vernon Jones and the future of Kyle Rittenhouse's bail fund.

Peters was a speaker at the 2022 America First Political Action Conference, where he called for the murders of Anthony Fauci (lynched by hanging), and Vernon Jones (executed by electric chair).

COVID-19 misinformation 
At the end of 2021, Peters was deplatformed from media services provider Spotify for pushing COVID-19 misinformation.

In January 2022, Peters became involved in the legal case of Scott Quiner. On the Stew Peters Show, Quiner's wife claimed that Mercy Hospital was refusing to give Quiner proper treatment because of his refusal to take the COVID-19 vaccine. Mercy Hospital refused to provide a reason for taking Quiner off of a ventilator citing patient privacy. Peters encouraged his listeners to "blow the hospitals phone lines up", and he also shared the hospital's address and named the doctors involved. Peters received criticism after his audience began making anonymous threats. After four days, Quiner was allowed to be transferred to a hospital in Texas which would provide the care that his family wanted. Quiner was described as the "most malnourished patient" a doctor at the Texas hospital had ever seen. He died on January 19, 2022.

In 2022, Peters started to produce long videos: These Little Ones, promoting the QAnon conspiracy about elites kidnapping children to drink their blood; Watch the Water, which claims that COVID-19 vaccines are derived from snake venom in order to transform people into "a hybrid of Satan", and Died Suddenly, which promotes misinformation about COVID-19 vaccines and Great Reset conspiracy theories. Peters publishes the videos on Rumble, using Twitter and Facebook to amplify their distribution. His Twitter account was suspended for a few months for breaching the platform's content policies, but was reactivated in mid-December 2022. Spotify and iHeartRadio have removed his content from their platform.

Political involvement
Starting in 2022, Peters has been speaking at political events, favoring the more extreme varieties of American conservatism. He endorsed the unsuccessful candidate Kandiss Taylor in the Republican primary for the 2022 Georgia gubernatorial election, and also supported Janice McGeachin and Wendy Rogers.

Personal life 
Peters has two sons and a daughter. He has coached his sons' hockey teams.

In February 2021, Peters was arrested after his wife called the police, saying that he had come home drunk and started throwing things around the house. Peters later pleaded guilty to a charge of disorderly conduct and was sentenced to probation. Peters abandoned his bounty hunting business in this period.

See also 
 Mike Lindell, a sponsor of the Stew Peters Show.

References

External links 

 

Living people
1980 births
Bounty hunters
American conspiracy theorists
COVID-19 conspiracy theorists
Far-right politics in the United States
American film producers